Peter James Byrne (born 9 June 1954) is an English recording artist, and lead singer for the pop/new wave duo Naked Eyes, during the earlier years of the 1980s. He is well known for his 1983 cover version of "Always Something There to Remind Me". He achieved further hits also writing his own songs, including "Promises, Promises" which also made it to the higher reaches of the U.S. Billboard Hot 100 record chart.

Byrne's music partner Rob Fisher later became a part of Climie Fisher, alongside another singer, Simon Climie. Fisher died in 1999, following surgery. Both friends were formerly a part of the short-lived group Neon, with Roland Orzabal and Curt Smith of Tears for Fears fame.

Byrne is also known for an electronica recording of The Rolling Stones' track, "Paint It Black". He also wrote "I Am the Cute One" for the Olsen twins' video, "Our First Video".

Byrne released a solo album The Real Illusion in 2001, which featured some of the last tracks he wrote with Fisher for a proposed third Naked Eyes album. In 2005, Byrne reformed Naked Eyes and released Fumbling with the Covers (2007) an album of acoustic hits, including reworkings of the band's "Promises, Promises", "When the Lights Go Out" and "Always Something There to Remind Me". Naked Eyes also performed on a US Summer Tour along with Belinda Carlisle, ABC and The Human League.

Discography

Solo albums
The Real Illusion (2001)

with Neon
"Making Waves" / "Me I See in You" (1980)
"Communication Without Sound" (1981)

with Naked Eyes
Burning Bridges (1983)
Fuel for the Fire (1984)
Fumbling with the Covers (2007)
Disguise the Limit (2021)

See also
 List of bands from Bristol

References

External links
Pete Byrne – special video features
Naked Eyes – The Story

1954 births
Living people
English pop singers
English new wave musicians
English male singers
Male new wave singers
British synth-pop new wave musicians
English expatriates in the United States
People from Bath, Somerset
Musicians from Bristol
Neon (British band) members
Naked Eyes members